"Lost Our Lisa" is the twenty-fourth and penultimate episode of the ninth season of the American animated television series The Simpsons. It originally aired on the Fox network in the United States on May 10, 1998. The episode contains the last appearance of the character Lionel Hutz. When Lisa learns that Marge cannot give her a ride to the museum and forbids her to take the bus, she tricks Homer into giving her permission. After Lisa gets lost, Homer goes looking for her and the two end up visiting the museum together.

The episode is analyzed in the books Planet Simpson, The Psychology of the Simpsons: D'oh!, and The Simpsons and Philosophy: The D'oh! of Homer, and received positive mention in I Can't Believe It's a Bigger and Better Updated Unofficial Simpsons Guide.

Plot
Bart and Milhouse visit a joke shop, and after Bart tries out some novelty props for his face, they visit Homer at the power plant to borrow his superglue for the props. Meanwhile, Marge and Lisa plan a trip to the Springsonian Museum, so they can see the Egyptian Treasures of Isis exhibit and the Orb of Isis. However, when Bart comes home and shows off his face props which he is now unable to remove, Marge is forced to take him to the hospital and is therefore unable to drive Lisa to the exhibit. She also forbids Lisa to take the bus alone, since it is too dangerous for her age.

Since this is Lisa's last chance to see the exhibit, she calls Homer to ask him if she can take the bus. When he initially seems uncertain, she tricks him into letting her take the bus by suggesting that she could take a limousine instead. However, Lisa boards the wrong bus; with the unsympathetic bus driver dropping her off in the middle of nowhere. At work, Homer tells Lenny and Carl that he let Lisa ride the bus alone. When they point out the error of his judgment, he leaves work to go look for her. He heads to the museum and ends up in downtown Springfield, where Lisa has hitched a ride to from Cletus. He uses a cherrypicker to get up higher. Homer and Lisa spot each other, but the vehicle's wheels creak backwards, and it rolls down a hill. It slides off the edge of a pier at the harbor into a river. Lisa tells the drawbridge operator to close the bridge, so Homer can grab on. His head is caught between the two closing halves, and he survives with nothing more than a few tire marks across his forehead.

Meanwhile, as Bart is examined by Dr. Hibbert, Hibbert manages to trick Bart into thinking he will give him a series of painful injections in his spine to get the props off his face. Bart sweats heavily in terror, resulting in the props falling off. Hibbert then explains that terror sweat was the key to removing the superglued props; the "weapon" he used is actually a button applicator. When Marge and Bart get home, she forces Bart to apologise to Lisa for ruining her trip; as he talks to her behind her bedroom door, he is unaware that she still is not home.

With Homer and Lisa re-united, he tells her that it is all right to take risks in life. The two decide to go to the museum after all, by illegally entering, since it is now closed. While there, Homer accidentally knocks the Orb of Isis onto the floor, where it splits open, revealing it to be a music box that had gone overlooked by scientists and museum staff. Lisa concludes that what her father said about risks was right – until the alarm goes off and guard dogs chase them out of the building.

Production

Writer Mike Scully came up with the idea for the plot because he used to live in West Springfield, Massachusetts and he would ask his parents if he could take the bus to Springfield, Massachusetts and they finally agreed to let him one day. The production team faced several challenges during development of this episode. The animators had to come up with a special mouth chart to draw Bart's mouth with the joke teeth in. The pile of dead animals in the back of Cletus' truck originally included dead puppies, but the animators thought it was too sad, so they removed them. Scully used to write jokes for Yakov Smirnoff, so he called him up to get the signs in Russian. Dan Castellaneta had to learn proper Russian pronunciation, so he could speak it during the chess scene in which he voiced the Russian chess player.

In the season 9 DVD release of the episode, The Simpsons animators use a telestrator to show similarities between Krusty and Homer in the episode. This episode contains the last showing of character Lionel Hutz. He is seen standing at the bus stop with Lisa, but does not speak. Due to Phil Hartman's death, the recurring characters of Lionel Hutz and Troy McClure were retired.

Themes
In his book Planet Simpson, Chris Turner cites Lisa's experiences on the bus as an example of "satirical laughs scored at the expense of Lisa's idealism". "Lost Our Lisa" is cited in The Simpsons and Philosophy: The D'oh! of Homer along with episodes "Lisa the Iconoclast", "Lisa the Beauty Queen", and "Lisa's Sax", in order to illustrate Homer's "success bonding with Lisa".

In The Psychology of the Simpsons: D'oh!, the authors utilize statements made by Homer in the episode to analyze the difference between heuristic and algorithmic decision-making. Homer explains to Lisa, "Stupid risks are what make life worth living. Now your mother, she's the steady type and that's fine in small doses, but me, I'm a risk-taker. That's why I have so many adventures!" The authors of The Psychology of The Simpsons interpret this statement by Homer to mean that he "relies on his past experiences of taking massive, death-defying risks and winding up okay to justify forging ahead in the most extreme circumstances".

The episode is another featuring Homer's near invulnerability to head injury, previously explained in "The Homer They Fall".

Reception
In its original broadcast, "Lost Our Lisa" finished 45th in ratings for the week of May 4–10, 1998, with a Nielsen rating of 7.8, equivalent to approximately 7.6 million viewing households. It was the fourth highest-rated show on the Fox network that week, following The X-Files, Ally McBeal, and King of the Hill.

Warren Martyn and Adrian Wood write positively of the episode in their book I Can't Believe It's a Bigger and Better Updated Unofficial Simpsons Guide: "A smashing episode, loads of good jokes and clever situations ... and best of all, Lisa working intelligently. The teaming up of father and daughter has rarely been more enjoyable and lovely. Gives you a warm feeling." A review of The Simpsons season 9 DVD release in the Daily Post notes that it includes "super illustrated colour commentaries" on "All Singing, All Dancing" and "Lost Our Lisa".

References

Bibliography

Further reading

External links

The Simpsons (season 9) episodes
1998 American television episodes